Thornbridge Hall is a large English country house situated near the village of Great Longstone in the local government district of Derbyshire Dales in Derbyshire.  It is a Grade II listed building.

History
From the 12th to the late 18th century, Thornbridge Hall was the seat of the Longsdon family. In 1790, Andrew Morewood bought Thornbridge Hall for the then very large sum of £10,000. He made his money exporting linens from Manchester to St Petersburg in Russia. The Morewood family considerably enlarged the house. In 1859, Frederick Craven rebuilt the house in Jacobean style and installed the William Morris/Edward Burne-Jones window in the Great Hall.

In 1896, George Marples, a Sheffield businessman and lawyer, extended the house to nearly its present form, built lodges and cottages, landscaped the park and gardens, added his own private railway station, and acquired the Watson buffet fountain from Chatsworth House.

From 1929, Charles Boot, the Sheffield entrepreneur who designed and built Pinewood Studios, added items from Clumber Park and panelling from Derwent Hall. His company, Henry Boot Construction, was contracted to demolish Clumber after a fire in 1938. It was Boot who was responsible for bringing the many items to Thornbridge, although most were lost to private buyers through auction. Thornbridge Hall is now home to a vast array of statues, facades and fountains originally belonging to Clumber.

Sheffield City Council took over the house in 1945 and it became a teacher training college, Thornbridge Hall College of Education. At this time the house was of sufficient note that a Great Western Railway GWR 6959 Class steam locomotive – No. 6964, built in May 1944 – was named Thornbridge Hall in  June 1947. It was withdrawn from service in September 1965 and later scrapped at T. Ward in Beighton, Sheffield. In later years, the hall was used as an educational and conference centre by the council, providing residential facilities for teachers and pupils in the house itself and in various outbuildings.

The Hunt family purchased the house from the Council in 1997, started restoration work to the gardens, and removed additions to the house to reveal its earlier proportions.

Gardens
The 12 acres of formal gardens were designed at the end of the 19th century by Simeon Marshall, working for the James Backhouses & Sons Nursery. They were inspired by the vision of the owner, George Marples, to create a '1000 shades of green' to be viewed from his bedroom window. Areas of the garden include the Italian Garden, Scented Terrace, Water Garden, Koi Pond, Kitchen Garden and Orangery, amongst others.

A programme of redevelopment in the gardens is currently underway.

2011 Scented Terrace created. Situated below the Kitchen Garden and The Orangery. The garden is full of lilacs, roses, bearded irises, lilies and other fragrant flowers and plants.

2017 New Knot Garden created. Replacing a box hedge knot garden, the new knot garden is full of stunning grasses, salvias, alliums, geums and yew

2019 Cascade Garden (phase1) created. Situated below the koi pond, and complete with a waterfall, this area has been terraced by gabions filled with a mixture of tufa and yew. Bananas, ginger, tree ferns, bamboo, gunnera and many other 'exotic' plants fill this area.

In 2017, the gardens became an RHS (Royal Horticultural Society) Partner Garden. They are open to the public on selected days between April and September.

Present use

From 2002, Thornbridge Hall has been owned by Jim and Emma Harrison, owners of Thornbridge Brewery and A4e respectively, and is both a private family home and a venue for events, including weddings. The gardens are open to the public between April and September.

The original Thornbridge Brewery was based in a converted joiner's and stonemason's workshop within the grounds of Thornbridge Hall.

See also
Listed buildings in Ashford-in-the-Water
Listed buildings in Great Longstone

References

External links
 Thornbridge Brewery
 Thornbridge Hall website

Country houses in Derbyshire
Gardens in Derbyshire